Jacobs Creek is a  tributary of the Youghiogheny River beginning in Acme, Pennsylvania and draining at its mouth in the town of Jacobs Creek into the Youghiogheny River.  Jacobs Creek is the southwestern border of Westmoreland County and the northwestern border of Fayette County. The area was a major producer of rye whiskey in the decades before Prohibition.

Variant names
According to the Geographic Names Information System, it has also been known historically as:
Jacob's Creek

Geography
Jacobs Creek, between Chaintown and its mouth, cuts a deep gorge through the Fayette Anticline, exposing many rock outcroppings and even exposures of the Freeport Coal seam.

The geography of Jacobs Creek allowed early civilization in the Jacobs Creek Valley as early as 1768 when western Pennsylvania was opened to settlement by the Treaty of Fort Stanwix. According to Rambling in the Valley of Jacobs Creek (Medsger & Rowe): 
Various industrial enterprises have been associated with the history of this valley. Among the first were the manufacture of salt and iron. By the treaty of Fort Stanwix in 1768 this region was opened for settlement and many people from the eastern part of the state were locating in this "land of promise". Both salt and iron were in demand, they were expensive and hard to procure, hence men of enterprise naturally sought means to supply these demands. George Dallas Albert in his "History of Westmoreland County", says that, "Foremost of the wants of these early settlers was the want of salt." He also states that "in the Youghiogheny region, twenty bushels of wheat was not thought an unfair exchange for a bushel of salt; or a cow and calf for a similar amount."

Other geographic features of the valley include two waterfalls: Freeman Falls and Creek Falls.

History

Jacobs Creek was named for Chief Jacob, a Native American. The valley of Jacobs Creek is home to an abundance of colonial and industrial history, including the home of the Alliance Furnace, the oldest standing iron furnace west of the Allegheny Mountains. The Alliance Furnace was built before ownership of the land was obtained by William Turnbul, John Holker, and Peter Marmie on July 13, 1789. The furnace was blown in 1802.

Starting in the 1790s Jacobs Creek attracted a number of Mennonite farmers. One of those Mennonites was Henry Oberholtzer (anglicized to "Overholt"). In 1800 Henry and his son Abraham cleared 150 acres near West Overton to start a farm. The farm grew rye for distilling into whiskey. The whiskey later became known as Old Overholt. Western Pennsylvania was a major producer of rye whiskey in the decades before Prohibition.

Other sources of industry along the valley include salt mills, grist mills, coke ovens, strip mining, and iron ore mining.

On December 19, 1907, an explosion in the Darr Coal Mine  killed 239 men and boys.

Recreation
Recreation along Jacobs Creek includes smallmouth bass and trout fishing, seasonal whitewater kayaking, and swimming. It has been the inspiration of the guide Ramblings in the Valley of Jacobs Creek.

Kayaking
  Acme to Laurelville (Class III-IV)
  Chaintown to Youghiogheny River (Class II-III)
 Freeman Falls (Class IV)
 Creek Falls (Class V Backwards U-Type Waterfall)

See also
List of rivers of Pennsylvania
Jacob's Creek Bridge (1801). The first iron-chain suspension bridge built in the United States.

References

Rivers of Pennsylvania
Tributaries of the Youghiogheny River
Rivers of Westmoreland County, Pennsylvania
Rivers of Fayette County, Pennsylvania